Asian Wave Alliance is an American political advocacy group. Based in New York City, the group describes itself as a nonpartisan political group for Asian-American New Yorkers that organizes voters.

The group has criticized affirmative action policies that they see as discriminatory. They advocate for merit-based systems in education.

In 2022, Asian Wave Alliance advocated for more Asian representation during the redistricting process of New York City Council's district boundaries. They celebrated the eventual creation of an Asian opportunity district in Brooklyn, the first of its kind.

References 

Organizations established in 2022
Political advocacy groups in the United States
501(c)(4) nonprofit organizations